Baron Ampthill, of Ampthill in the County of Bedfordshire, is a title in the Peerage of the United Kingdom. It was created on 11 March 1881 for the diplomat Lord Odo Russell. He was the third son of Major-General Lord George Russell, second son of John Russell, 6th Duke of Bedford.

His son, the second Baron, served as Governor of Madras from 1899 to 1906 and was interim Viceroy of India in 1904. His grandson, the fourth Baron, was one of the ninety elected hereditary peers that remained in the House of Lords after the passing of the House of Lords Act 1999, and sat as a cross-bencher.  the title is held by the latter's son, the fifth Baron, who succeeded his father in 2011.

Coat of arms
The heraldic blazon for the coat of arms of the barony is: Argent, a lion rampant gules, on a chief sable three escallops argent, a mullet or for difference.

Barons Ampthill (1881)
Odo William Leopold Russell, 1st Baron Ampthill (1829–1884)
Arthur Oliver Villiers Russell, 2nd Baron Ampthill (1869–1935)
John Hugo Russell, 3rd Baron Ampthill (1896–1973)
Geoffrey Denis Erskine Russell, 4th Baron Ampthill (1921–2011)
David Whitney Erskine Russell, 5th Baron Ampthill (b. 1947)

The heir presumptive is the present holder's brother, Anthony John Mark Russell (b. 1952).

Family tree

The 5th Baron is 4th cousin once removed of the 15th Duke of Bedford and is currently 16th in the line of succession to the dukedom.

Notes

See also
 Duke of Bedford
 Earl Russell
 Earl of Orford
 Russell case

References

 

Baronies in the Peerage of the United Kingdom
Noble titles created in 1881
Ampthill
Russell family